Matt Crouch may refer to:

 Matt Crouch (TBN), American Christian broadcaster
 Matt Crouch (footballer), Australian rules footballer